Allen Mitchell Burdett Jr. (25 August 1921 – 8 July 1980) was a United States Army lieutenant general.

Early life 
Burdett was born in Washington, D.C. on August 25, 1921 to Allen Sr. and Margaret Burdett. He also had a brother named Lucien. His ancestors fought in every American conflict since the Revolutionary War. His father, a highly respected military judge, became the Army's senior JAG colonel. As a Boy Scout at Fort Leavenworth, Kansas, Burdett began his lifelong friendship with a future United States Military Academy (USMA) classmate, Arch Hamblen. Upon graduation from Western High School in Washington, DC, in 1939, he was appointed to the USMA by Senator Richard Russell Jr. of Georgia.

Education 
 1943: Bachelor of Science, United States Military Academy
 1951: Graduate Infantry School
 1953: Command and General Staff College
 1955: Armed Forces Staff College, Norfolk, Virginia
 1959: Army War College
 1965: Master's degree in International Affairs, George Washington University

Military service

Dates of rank 
 June 1, 1943: Second lieutenant
 December 1, 1943: First lieutenant
 November 6, 1944: Captain
 August 7, 1946: Major
 March 16, 1953: Lieutenant colonel
 September 1, 1959: Colonel
 October 22, 1966: Brigadier general
 c. 1970: Major general
 1973: Lieutenant general

Assignments 

 1940 – 1943: Attended the United States Military Academy, graduated on June 1, 1943
 1943 – 1947: Served in World War II with the Headquarters and Headquarters Company, 255th Infantry Regiment, 63rd Infantry Division, commissioned (ASN: O-26048), reached the rank of Major
 1947 – 1950: Assistant Professor, Military science and tactics, Georgia Institute of Technology
 1950 – 1952: S3 and Battalion Executive Officer, 508th Airborne Regimental Combat Team
 1953 – 1954: Infantry Battalion Commander, Regimental Executive Officer, 31st Infantry Regiment, 7th Infantry Division
 1954: G1 and G2, 7th Infantry Division
 1955 – 1958: Army Representative Office of the Commandant of the United States Air Force Academy
 1960 – 1962: Director of the Combat Devels and worked in the office of the deputy assistant commandant of the Army Aviation School
 1962 – 1965: Executive Officer to the Assistant Secretary of the Army
 1965 – 1966: Commanding Officer of the 11th Aviation Group, 1st Cavalry Division
 1966 – 1968: Military assistant in the Office of the Director of the Office of Defense, Research and Engineering
 1968 – 1969: Assistant Division Commander, 101st Airborne Division
 1969 – 1970: Commanding general of the 1st Aviation Brigade
 1970: Director of Army Aviation, Office of the Assistant Chief of Staff for Force Development, Department of the Army
 1970 – 1973: Commanding general of the United States Army Aviation Center and commandant of the United States Army Aviation School, Fort Rucker, Alabama
 1973 – 1975: Commanding general of III Corps, Fort Hood, Texas
 1975 – 1978: Commanding general of the 5th United States Army, Fort Sam Houston, Texas
 1978: Retired from military service on June 30, 1978 with the rank of lieutenant general.

Personal life 
On 19 April 1948, Burdett married Antoinette Salley in Asheville, North Carolina. Together they had four children (Allen III, Douglas, William, and Margaret). His daughter was killed in a car accident in 1984. His wife died on April 24, 2008.

After retirement 
He continued his work with the Board of Directors of the United Services Automobile Association (USAA). He was a longtime member of the Army-Navy Town Club and the Army-Navy Country Club; as a member of the Falls Church Presbyterian Church, Falls Church, Virginia, he served as a deacon; as a member of the Covenant Presbyterian Church, San Antonio, he was a ruling elder. He was also a member of the Society of the Cincinnati.

Death 
Burdett died of cancer on 8 July 1980 in San Antonio, Texas, following a two-month illness. He was buried in the Fort Sam Houston National Cemetery in San Antonio, Texas.

Awards & decorations 
 Combat Infantryman Badge
 United States Army Senior Aviator Badge
 Senior Parachutist Badge
 Army Staff Identification Badge
 Office of the Secretary of Defense Identification Badge
 Army Distinguished Service Medal with bronze oak leaf cluster
 Silver Star Medal with bronze oak leaf cluster
 Legion of Merit with bronze oak leaf cluster
 Distinguished Flying Cross with bronze oak leaf cluster
 Bronze Star Medal with 2 oak leaf clusters
 Air Medal with 24 oak leaf clusters
 Army Commendation Medal
 Air Force Commendation Medal
 Purple Heart
 National Order of Vietnam 5th Class
 Republic of Vietnam Gallantry Cross with palm
 Vietnam Air Force Distinguished Service Order
 Presidential Unit Citation
 Meritorious Unit Commendation with oak leaf cluster
 Republic of Korea Presidential Unit Citation

In 1980 he was inducted into the Army Aviation Hall of Fame in Atlanta, Georgia.

The Lt. Gen. Allen M. Burdett Jr. Army Aviation Flight Safety Award was named in his honor in 1970.

The National Boy Scout Court of Honor awarded him the Silver Beaver, one of scouting's highest awards.

The San Antonio chapter of the American Red Cross honored him by establishing a volunteer award in his name.

References

External links 
 https://www.westpointaog.org/memorial-article?id=933ff511-e51d-41e1-a6de-dfdf09e4cbec
 https://www.vhpa.org/DAT/datB/G60336.HTM
 https://encyclopedia2.thefreedictionary.com/Burdett%2c+Allen+Mitchell%2c+Jr.
 https://www.fold3.com/page/628095309-allen-burdett-1921/facts
 http://www.quad-a.org/Public/Awards/Awardees/BurdettAM.aspx
 https://www.army.mil/article/87160/tradoc_cg_presents_award_participates_in_islc
 Article title
 https://www.washingtonpost.com/archive/local/1980/07/18/gen-a-m-burdett-dies-saw-combat-in-3-wars/31e5309c-5962-4613-aa0d-6360b64f51f1/
 Primer of the Helicopter War, by Charles Holley and Mike Sloniker (1997), page 95
 The War Managers, by Douglas Kinnard (1979), page 184
 Historic Killeen: An Illustrated History, by Gerald D. Skidmore (2010), page 38
 The Human Tradition in America Since 1945, by David L. Anderson (2003), page 104
 Army Aviation Leaders
 http://www.vietnamwar.net/FirstAviationBrigade.htm
 https://www.newspapers.com/newspage/196260123/

1921 births
1980 deaths
United States Military Academy alumni
Military personnel from Washington, D.C.
United States Army Command and General Staff College alumni
Joint Forces Staff College alumni
United States Army War College alumni
Elliott School of International Affairs alumni
United States Army personnel of World War II
American military personnel of the Korean War
United States Army personnel of the Vietnam War
American Senior Army Aviators
Recipients of the Air Medal
Recipients of the Distinguished Flying Cross (United States)
Recipients of the Silver Star
Recipients of the Distinguished Service Order (Vietnam)
Recipients of the Legion of Merit
United States Army generals
Recipients of the Distinguished Service Medal (US Army)
People from Falls Church, Virginia
Military personnel from San Antonio
Deaths from cancer in Texas
Burials at Fort Sam Houston National Cemetery